Conus anabathrum is a species of sea snail, a marine gastropod mollusk in the family Conidae, the cone snails and their allies.

Like all species within the genus Conus, these snails are predatory and venomous. They are capable of "stinging" humans, therefore live ones should be handled carefully or not at all.

There are three subspecies :
 Conus anabathrum anabathrum Crosse, 1865: alternate representation of Conus anabathrum
 Conus anabathrum antoni Cargile, 2011: synonym of Conus burryae Clench, 1942
 Сonus anabathrum tranthami Petuch, 1998: synonym of Gradiconus anabathrum tranthami (Petuch, 1998) accepted as Conus burryae Clench, 1942

Distribution
This species occurs in the Caribbean Sea and the Gulf of Mexico

Description 
The maximum recorded shell length is 51 mm. The spire is elevated, and gradate. The body whorl is grooved towards the base. The color of the shell is pale yellowish brown, with a central white band and scattered white maculations, obscurely encircled by lines of light chestnut spots.

Habitat 
Minimum recorded depth is 0 m. Maximum recorded depth is 122 m.

Gallery

References

 Sowerby, G. B., II. 1870. Descriptions of forty-eight new species of shells. Proceedings of the Zoological Society of London 1870: 249–259, pls. 21–22
 Petuch, E. J. 1987. New Caribbean molluscan faunas. [v] + 154 + A1-A4, 29 pls. Coastal Education & Research Foundation: Charlottesville, Virginia.
 Petuch, E. J. 1995. Molluscan discoveries from the tropical Western Atlantic region. La Conchiglia 27(275) 36–41.
 Pointier, J.-P. and D. Lamy. 1998. Guide des Coquillages des Antilles. i + 225 pp. PLB Editions: Abymes, Guadeloupe.
 Filmer R.M. (2001). A Catalogue of Nomenclature and Taxonomy in the Living Conidae 1758 – 1998. Backhuys Publishers, Leiden. 388pp.
 Rosenberg, G., F. Moretzsohn, and E. F. García. 2009. Gastropoda (Mollusca) of the Gulf of Mexico, Pp. 579–699 in Felder, D.L. and D.K. Camp (eds.), Gulf of Mexico–Origins, Waters, and Biota. Biodiversity. Texas A&M Press, College Station, Texas
 Tucker J.K. & Tenorio M.J. (2009) Systematic classification of Recent and fossil conoidean gastropods. Hackenheim: Conchbooks. 296 pp
 Tucker J.K. (2009). Recent cone species database. September 4th 2009 Edition
 Monnier E. & Limpalaër L. (2012) Dauciconus colombi (Gastropoda: Conidae), a new species from Martinique. Visaya 3(5): 15–19. [March 2012]
  Puillandre N., Duda T.F., Meyer C., Olivera B.M. & Bouchet P. (2015). One, four or 100 genera? A new classification of the cone snails. Journal of Molluscan Studies. 81: 1–23

External links
 The Conus Biodiversity website
 Cone Shells – Knights of the Sea
 

anabathrum
Gastropods described in 1865